Sir Stephen Chapman (5 June 1907 – 23 March 1991) was a British barrister and High Court judge who sat in the Queen's Bench Division from 1966 to 1981.

Stephen Chapman was the son of the economist Sir Sydney Chapman, Chief Economic Adviser to HM Government, and Lady (Mabel Gwendoline) Chapman.

References 

 https://www.ukwhoswho.com/view/10.1093/ww/9780199540891.001.0001/ww-9780199540884-e-171634

External links 

 

1907 births
1991 deaths
Queen's Bench Division judges
Knights Bachelor